The Miguel Muñoz Trophy is a football award for team managers in Spanish football, established by Spanish newspaper Marca in 2006, in memory of the legendary Real Madrid manager Miguel Muñoz.

The award is based on MARCA's subjective scoring system: in which a manager is scored out of three, each match, for his team's performances. The manager with the highest points total, in each of La Liga and the Segunda División, is declared their respective league's winner at the end of the season.

La Liga

Segunda División

See also
 Pichichi Trophy
 Zamora Trophy
 Zarra Trophy
 Trofeo Alfredo Di Stéfano
 Don Balón Award

La Liga trophies and awards
Spanish football trophies and awards
Awards established in 2006
2006 establishments in Spain